Cornești may refer to several places:

Romania
 Cornești, Cluj, a commune in Cluj County
 Cornești, Dâmbovița, a commune in Dâmbovița County
 Cornești, a village in Filipești Commune, Bacău County
 Cornești, a village in Gârbău Commune, Cluj County
 Cornești, a village in Mihai Viteazu Commune, Cluj County
 Cornești, a village in Bălești Commune, Gorj County
 Cornești, a village in Miroslava Commune, Iași County
 Cornești, a village in Călinești Commune, Maramureș County
 Cornești, a village in Adămuș Commune, Mureș County
 Cornești, a village in Crăciunești Commune, Mureș County
 Cornești, a village in Orțișoara Commune, Timiș County
 Cornești, a tributary of the river Prut in Botoșani County

Moldova
 Cornești, Moldova, a city in Ungheni district
 Cornești, Ungheni, a commune in Ungheni district
 Cornești, a village in Secăreni Commune, Hîncești district
 Cornești Hills, on the Moldavian Plateau

Ukraine
 Cornești, the Romanian name for Korneshty village, Rukhotyn, Chernivtsi Oblast

See also 
 Cornel (disambiguation)
 Cornelia (disambiguation)
 Cornu (disambiguation)
 Corni (disambiguation)
 Cornea (disambiguation)
 Cornetu (disambiguation)
 Cornățel (disambiguation)
 Corneanu (disambiguation)